María Isabel Sanz-Agero (born November 20, 1965) is a Guatemalan modern pentathlete. She placed 31st in the women's individual event at the 2004 Summer Olympics. She is the mother of modern pentathlete Rita Sanz-Agero.

References

1965 births
Living people
Guatemalan female modern pentathletes
Olympic modern pentathletes of Guatemala
Modern pentathletes at the 2004 Summer Olympics
Modern pentathletes at the 1999 Pan American Games
Pan American Games competitors for Guatemala